Library associations connect libraries and library workers at the local, national, and international level. Library associations often provide resources to their individual and institutional members that enable cooperation, exchange of information, education, research, and development.

International
 Asociación de Estados Iberoamericanos para el Desarrollo de las Bibliotecas Nacionales de Iberoamérica
Association internationale francophone des bibliothécaires et documentalistes (AIFBD)
Association of Caribbean University, Research and Institutional Libraries (ACURIL)
Association of Christian Librarians
Commonwealth Library Association
Information for Social Change
International Association of Agricultural Information Specialists (IAALD)
International Association of Aquatic and Marine Science Libraries and Information Centers (IAMSLIC)
International Association of Law Libraries
International Association of Music Libraries
International Association of Music Libraries, Archives and Documentation Centres
International Association of School Librarianship 
International Association of University Libraries
International Council on Archives
International Federation of Library Associations and Institutions (IFLA)
Librarians for Fairness
Masonic Library and Museum Association 
Polar Libraries Colloquy
Progressive Librarians Guild
Seminar on the Acquisition of Latin American Library Materials (SALALM)
Special Libraries Association (SLA)

Africa
African Library and Information Associations and Institutions (AfLIA)
Botswana Library Association (BLA)
Egyptian Library Association (ELA)
Ghana Library Association
Health Information and Libraries in Africa
Kenya Library Association
Lesotho Library Association
Library and Information Association of South Africa (LIASA)
Library and Information Association of Zambia (LIAZ)
Malawi Library Association (MALA)
Namibian Information Workers Association
Tanzania Library Association (TLA)
Uganda Library Association (ULA)
Swaziland Library Association (SWALA)
West Africa Library Association
Zimbabwe Library Association (ZimLA)
Nigerian Library Association (NLA)

Asia
Academic Library Association (ALA), India
Association of Librarians in Public Sector (ALPS), Inc.
Association of Special Libraries of the Philippines
Bangladesh Association of Librarians, Information Scientists and Documentalists
Bengal Library Association
Central Government Library Association
China Society for Library Science
East-Kazakhstan Librarians' Association
Hong Kong Library Association 
Indian Association of Special Libraries and Information Centres (IASLIC)
Indian Academic Library Association
Indian Library Association (ILA)
Iranian Library and Information Science Association
Iranian Librarians Association of America
Iranian Medical Library Association
The union of Iranian library and information science student associations (ADKA)
Israeli Association of Librarians and Information Professionals
Japan Association of Private University Libraries
Japan Library Association
Japan Medical Library Association
Japan School Library Association
Japan Special Libraries Association
 Junior College Library Association (Japan)
Kerala Library Association
Kerala Library Professionals Organization 
Korean Library Association (South Korea)
Librarians Association of Malaysia
Librarians Association of Metro Pampanga (LAMP)
Library Association of Bangladesh
Library Association of China (Taiwan)
Library Association of Singapore
 Library Association of the Democratic People's Republic of Korea (North Korea)
Library Association of the Republic of China
Macau Library and Information Management Association
Medical and Health Librarians Association of the Philippines
Medical Library Association of India
Middle East Librarians Association
Mongolian Library Association (MLA)
Nepal Library Association (NLA)
Network of Academic Law Libraries, Inc. (NALL)
Pakistan Library Association
Pakistan Librarians Welfare Organization
Pakistan Library Automation Group (PakLAG)
Philippine Association of Academic and Research Librarians
Pakistan Library Club
Philippine Association of School Librarians, Inc.
Philippine Group of Law Librarians, Inc.
Philippine Librarians Association, Inc.
Regional Federation of South Asian Library Associations
Thai Library Association
Uzbekistan Library Association 
Turkish Librarians Association - Turkey
University and Research Librarians Association - Turkey
University of Peshawar Library & Information Science Alumni Association - Pakistan
Telangana library student association(TLIBSA)

Caribbean

Association of Caribbean University, Research and Institutional Libraries (ACURIL)
Association of Librarians in the Jamaica Library Service (ALJAS)
Caribbean Association of Law Libraries (CARALL)
Cayman Islands Information Professionals (CIIP)
Library and Information Association of Jamaica (LIAJA)
Library Association of Trinidad and Tobago (LATT)
Library Association of Barbados (LAB)
Library Association of Bermuda (LAB)

Europe
Art Libraries Association
ASLIB (UK); formerly 'Association of Special Libraries and Information Bureaux (ASLIB)'
Association of Andalusian Librarians (Spain)
Association of Church Librarians in Spain
 Association of European Research Libraries ( (LIBER))
Association of French Librarians
Association of Greek Librarians & Information Scientists
Association of Hungarian Librarians
Association of information and documentation professionals, ADBS, formerly the Association of specialized librarians and librarians (French)
Association of Libraries of Czech Universities
Association of Library and Information Professionals of the Czech Republic
Association of Valencian Librarians (ABV) (Spain)
Austrian Association of Librarians
Austrian Library Association
Bavarian Library Network (BVB)
Belarusian Library Association
Belgian Association for Documentation
British and Irish Association of Law Librarians
Bulgarian Library Association
Chartered Institute of Library and Information Professionals (CILIP), formerly the Library Association and the Institute of Information Scientists (UK)
Col·legi Oficial de Bibliotecaris-Documentalistes de Catalunya (COBDC)
Consortium of European Research Libraries (CERL)
Croatian Library Association
Cyprus Association of Librarians – Information Scientists (CALIS)
Danish Library Association
Danish Union of Librarians
Digital Library Association of Armenia
Dutch Association of University Libraries, the Royal Library and the Library of the Royal Dutch Academy of Science
Dutch National Association of Public Libraries
Education and Libraries Association (Spain)
Estonian Librarians Association
European Association for Health Information and Libraries (EAHIL)
European Association of Aquatic Sciences Libraries and Information Centres (Euraslic)
European Association of Libraries and Information Services on Addictions (Elisad), formerly the European Association of Libraries and Information Services on Alcohol and other Drugs
European Association of Sinological Librarians (EASL)
European Bureau of Library, Information and Documentation Associations (EBLIDA)
Federation Union of German Library and Information Associations
Finland's Swedish Library Association
Finnish Library Association
Finnish Music Library Association
Finnish Research Library Association
Galician Library Association (ABG) (Spain)
Georgian Association of Information Specialists
Georgian Library Association
German Library Association 
Icelandic Library and Information Science Association
Italian Library Association
Latvian Librarians Association
Library & Information Science Promotion Society (India)
Library Association of Ireland
Lithuanian Librarian's Association
M25 Consortium of Academic Libraries
Malta Library and Information Association
Navarrese Association of Librarians (ASNABI) (Spain)
Netherlands Public Library Association
Norwegian Association of Special Libraries
Norwegian Library Association
Norwegian Union of Librarians
Polish Librarians Association
Portuguese Association of Librarians, Archivists and Documentalists
Private Libraries Association (UK)
Professional Association of Information Specialists (APEI) (Spain)
Russian Library Association
Romanian Library Association
School Library Association (UK)
Slovenian Library Association
Spanish Federation of Societies of Archivist, Librarians, Documentalist and Museology (FESABID)
Swedish Library Association
Swiss Association Library & Information Management (SLI)
Ukrainian Library Association
The Czech Republic Libraries Association (SDRUK ČR)
Turkish University and Research Librarians' Association (UNAK)
Turkish Librarians' Association (TKDt)

Latin America
Librarian Association of El Salvador
Comité de Cooperación entre Bibliotecas Universitarias de Guatemala
Asociación Bibliotecológica de Guatemala
Argentinian Library Association
 Brazilian Federation of Associations of Librarians, Information Scientists and Institutions (FEBAB)
 Colombian Library Association (ASCOLBI)
Asociación Mexicana de Bibliotecarios (AMBAC)
Colegio Nacional de Bibliotecarios, A.C. (México)
Colegio de Bibliotecarios de Chile (Chile)
Sociedad de Bibliotecarios de Puerto Rico (SBPR)
Asociación de Bibliotecarios Escolares de Puerto Rico
Asociación Paraguaya de Gestores de la Información (APGI)

North America

American Library Association (ALA)
American Association of Law Libraries (AALL)
American Association of School Librarians (AASL)
American Indian Library Association (AILA)
American Theological Library Association (ATLA)
Art Libraries Society of North America (ARLIS/NA)
Asian/Pacific American Librarians Association
Association des bibliothèques publiques du Québec (ABPQ)
Association pour la promotion des services documentaires scolaires (APSDS) 
Association of Architecture School Librarians
Association of Caribbean University, Research and Institutional Libraries
Association of Christian Librarians (ACL)
Association of College and Research Libraries (ACRL)
Association of Jewish Libraries
Association of Research Libraries (ARL)
Association of Southeastern Research Libraries (ASERL)
Atlantic Provinces Library Association (APLA)
British Columbia Library Association (BCLA)
Border Regional Library Association (BRLA)
Boston Library Consortium (BLC)
Cache Valley Library Association (CVLA)
Canadian Association for School Libraries
Canadian Association for Information Science (CAIS-ACSI)
Canadian Association of Law Libraries / Association Canadienne des Bibliothèques de Droit (CALL / ACBD)
The Canadian Association of Professional Academic Librarians / L’Association Canadienne des Bibliothécaires en Enseignement Supérieur (CAPAL / ACBAP)
Canadian Association of Research Libraries / Association des Bibliothèques de Recherche du Canada (CARL / ABRC)
Canadian Association of Special Libraries and Information Services
Canadian Health Libraries Association / Association des bibliothèques de la santé du Canada (CHLA / ABSC)
Canadian Federation of Library Associations/Fédération canadienne des associations de bibliothèques (CFLA-FCAB)
Catholic Library Association 
Chinese American Librarians Association
Church and Synagogue Library Association
Corporation des bibliothécaires professionnels du Québec (CBPQ)
Evangelical Church Library Association
Fédération des milieux documentaires (FMD)
Florida Association for Media in Education
Foothills Library Association
Greater Edmonton Library Association
L'association des bibliothécaires du Québec/Quebec Library Association
Library Association of Alberta (LAA) 
Library Information Technology Association (LITA)
Lubbock Area Library Association
Major Orchestra Librarians' Association
Manitoba Library Association (MLA)
Medical Library Association
Metrolina Library Association
Metropolitan New York Library Council (METRO)
Mohave Library Alliance
Mountain Plains Library Association
Music Library Association
New England Library Association
Newfoundland and Labrador Library Association (NLLA)
North American Serials Interest Group (NASIG)
Nova Scotia Library Association (NSLA)
Northwest Territories Library Association (NWTLA)
Nunavut Library Association
Ontario Library Association (OLA)
Pacific Northwest Library Association
Patent and Trademark Depository Library Association
Polish American Librarians Association (PALA)
Public Library Association
Saskatchewan Library Association (SLA) 
Southeastern Library Association
Southwestern Library Association
Substance Abuse Librarians & Information Specialists (SALIS)
Theatre Library Association
United States Agricultural Information Network
Urban Libraries Council
USA Toy Library Association
Western Association of Map Libraries
Yukon Library Association

Oceania
Australian and New Zealand Theological Library Association
Australian Law Librarians' Association
Australian Library and Information Association
Australian School Library Association
Australian School Library Association (NSW)
Library and Information Association of New Zealand operating as LIANZA
Pacific Islands Association of Libraries and Archives
School Library Association of New Zealand Aotearoa
School Library Association of South Australia (SLASA)
School Library Association of Victoria
Council of Australian University Librarians
Public Libraries Australia
Public Libraries NSW - Country (formerly Country Public Libraries Association NSW)
Metropolitan Public Libraries Association (NSW)

See also
History of Public Library Advocacy
Public Library Advocacy

References